Adrian Timmis (born 20 June 1964) is an English former professional racing cyclist.

In 1981 he rode in the British National Track Championships. He then represented Britain in the team pursuit event at the 1984 Olympic Games in Los Angeles. Between 1986 and 1995, he was a professional cyclist. He rode the Tour de France in  1987, and competed in the international Paris-Nice race, Criterium International, Tour de Romandie, Liège–Bastogne–Liège, La Flèche Wallonne, Amstel Gold and the Het Volk.

Towards the end of its professional career, he began mountain biking in 1989, while going  forward to ride  for Raleigh Cycles.

He worked for the Linda McCartney Foods team and the British National team in the World Championships, Olympic Games and Commonwealth Games.

Major results

Road

 1985
 1st Final Leg Milk Race
 1st Tour of Lancashire
 1st Tour of Merseyside

 1986
 2nd National Championships Professional Race Road Britain
 4th Nissan Classic, Ireland
 7th GP Isbergues, France

 1987
 70th Tour de France
 8th Midi Libre
 1st Leg 4, Midi Libre
 2nd Leg 6a, Midi Libre
 1988
 1st Tour of Delyn

 1995
 1st Sky TV Crit Rochester

Track
 1981
 1st Pursuit Britain Track National Championships (Junior)
 2nd Races Track National Championships Points Britain (Junior)
 3rd Pursuit  Track National Championships Team Britain (Junior)

 1985
 2nd Pursuit Britain Track National Championships (Amateur)
 3rd Pursuit  Track National Championships Team Britain (Amateur)

 1987
 3rd Pursuit Britain Track National Championships (Professional)

Mountain biking
 1992
 3rd Series Britain National Points

 1994
 3rd British Hill Climb Championships

 1995
 2nd Series Britain National Points
 1st leg Nannerch, Britain National Points Series
 1st leg Castle Combe, Britain National Points Series

Cyclo-cross
 2004
 1st National Championships Cyclo Cross Britain (Veteran)

 2004/2005
 4th Series Britain National Points

References

External links
 
 
 Profile on Olympics.org.uk
 

1964 births
Living people
British male cyclists
Sportspeople from Stoke-on-Trent
Cyclists at the 1984 Summer Olympics
Olympic cyclists of Great Britain